Bagman is a platform game released in arcades by Valadon Automation in 1982.
It was licensed to Stern for U.S. distribution in 1983 and to Taito in Japan the same year. In France, the game is titled Le Bagnard (English: The Convict). Bagman was followed-up with Super Bagman in 1984.

Gameplay
The objective of the game is to maneuver the bagman through various mine shafts, picking up money bags and placing them in a wheelbarrow at the surface of the mine. The player must avoid pursuing guards, moving ore carts, and descending elevators. The player may temporarily stun the guards by striking them with a pickaxe or by dropping money bags on them when they are below the player on the same ladder. The player may move between the three screens which make up the level via shafts and on the surface.

Bagman is played using one 4-way joystick and one action button. The joystick is also used to jump out of the ore cart. The action button is used to perform the following tasks:

Pick up and drop money bags
Pick up and drop pickaxe
Grab and release the ceiling beam to avoid the ore cart (this can be done while carrying a money bag)
Placing a money bag in the wheelbarrow
Pick up and drop the wheelbarrow

Points are scored for each horizontal step the player takes, for each money bag placed in the wheelbarrow, and for each guard stunned.

Reception 
In Japan, Game Machine listed the game on their June 15, 1983 issue as the third most-successful new table arcade unit of the month. In the United States, it was among the thirteen highest-grossing arcade games of 1983.

Legacy
Aardvark Action Software published clones for the Commodore 64 and TRS-80 Color Computer as Bagitman. Ocean Software released a clone for the Amstrad CPC, Commodore 64, and ZX Spectrum in 1984 titled Gilligan's Gold.

In 2010 a French programmer reconstructed source code from the game to port it to modern platforms.

References

External links 

1982 video games
Arcade video games
Arcade-only video games
Platform games
Stern video games
Video games developed in France